John Wornham Penfold (3 December 1828 – 5 July 1909) was a surveyor and architect born in Haslemere, Surrey where he is also buried. The house in which he once lived, "Penfolds", is still to be found near the centre of the town.

Penfold did his articles with Thomas Talbot Bury and Charles Lee between 1845 and 1850.  Following his articles he worked for William Burn, before striking out to his own practice at Charlotte Row, Mansion House, London in 1854.

During his career Penfold was made President of the Architectural Association School of Architecture (1859–1860) and an associate of the Royal Institute of British Architects, becoming a fellow in 1881. He was a founding member of the Royal Institution of Chartered Surveyors and its Honorary Secretary from 1868 to 1904.

Penfold designed the hexagonal British post box in 1866, now known as a Penfold box.

Trivia
In the cartoon series Danger Mouse, DM's sidekick is named Penfold after J.W. Penfold, since the duo's secret hideout was in a post box in Baker Street. However, Danger Mouse and Penfold's hideout was not a Penfold box, but an Anonymous box.

References and sources
Notes

Sources
In memory of John Penfold

1828 births
1909 deaths
People from Haslemere
Associates of the Royal Institute of British Architects